Oskarshamn Airport was an airport in Oskarshamn, Sweden . It was built in 1970 and closed in 2014.

The connection with Stockholm-Arlanda was closed down on 17 April 2014. In May 2014 there was a decision by the municipality to close down the airport totally. The nearest other airport is Kalmar Airport,  from Oskarshamn. The airport is still used for some general aviation.

Statistics

Accidents 
In 1989 a domestic scheduled passenger flight crashed on landing. It was a Beechcraft 99 operated by Holmström Flyg, scheduled from Stockholm Arlanda to Oskarshamn. All 16 on board died.

External links 
 Official website
 Oskarshamns Flygklubb (Oskarshamn Aviation Club)

See also
 List of the largest airports in the Nordic countries

References 

Airports in Sweden
Buildings and structures in Kalmar County